The 1987 Major League Baseball season ended with the American League Champion  Minnesota Twins winning the World Series over the National League Champion St. Louis Cardinals, four games to three, as all seven games were won by the home team.

In June, future Hall of Fame outfielder Ken Griffey Jr. was selected with the number one overall pick in the Major League Baseball draft, by the Seattle Mariners.

Awards and honors
Baseball Hall of Fame
Ray Dandridge
Catfish Hunter
Billy Williams

Other awards
Outstanding Designated Hitter Award: Harold Baines (CWS)
Roberto Clemente Award (Humanitarian): Rick Sutcliffe (CHC).
Rolaids Relief Man Award: Dave Righetti (NYY, American); Steve Bedrosian (PHI, National).

Player of the Month

Pitcher of the Month

Statistical leaders

Standings

American League

National League

Postseason

Bracket

Managers

American League

National League

Home Field Attendance & Payroll

Television coverage

Events

January 14 – Catfish Hunter and Billy Williams are elected to the Hall of Fame by the Baseball Writers' Association of America.
March 3 – Ray Dandridge, a third baseman from the Negro leagues, is the only player elected to the Hall of Fame by the Special Veterans Committee.
April 6 – Los Angeles Dodgers General manager Al Campanis, a former teammate of Jackie Robinson, appears on the ABC news program, Nightline to discuss the progress of racial integration of baseball on the fortieth anniversary of Robinson's first game.  When asked why more African-Americans have not become managers or executives, Campanis states that Blacks may lack certain qualities for those jobs, drawing the ire of host Ted Koppel.  Campanis was fired two days later.
April 13 – At Jack Murphy Stadium, the San Diego Padres set a major league record when the first three batters in the bottom of the first inning hit home runs off San Francisco Giants starter Roger Mason in their home opener. The Padres, trailing 3–0, got homers from Marvell Wynne, Tony Gwynn and John Kruk. Despite this, the Padres lost 13-6. This record would be matched in 2003.
April 15 – Juan Nieves of the Milwaukee Brewers pitches a no-hitter against the Baltimore Orioles. He becomes the second-youngest pitcher in major league history to accomplish the feat, and the first Brewer.
April 17 – Mike Schmidt of the Philadelphia Phillies hits the 500th home run of his career. It came in the ninth inning against the Pittsburgh Pirates' Don Robinson, giving the Phillies an 8–6 win.
June 2 – The Seattle Mariners use the number-one overall pick of the draft to select Ken Griffey Jr., signaling a turnaround in their fortunes as an organization.
June 28 – Don Baylor of the visiting Boston Red Sox is hit by a pitch from Rick Rhoden in the sixth inning of a 6–2 win over the New York Yankees. The HBP gives Baylor 244 for his career, breaking Ron Hunt's modern-day record.
July 14 – Tim Raines caps a 3-for-3 performance in the All-Star Game with a two-run triple in the top of the 13th inning, giving the National League a 2–0 victory over the American League. Raines is selected the MVP.
July 18 – New York Yankees first baseman Don Mattingly homers in his record-tying eighth straight game, in a 7–2 loss to the Texas Rangers.  He ties the record set by Dale Long in 1956.
August 11 – Mark McGwire of the Oakland Athletics breaks Al Rosen's American League rookie record by hitting his 38th home run in an 8–2 loss to the Mariners.
August 26 – Paul Molitor of the Milwaukee Brewers goes hitless, and ends his 39-game hitting streak; it is the longest American League hitting streak since Joe DiMaggio's 56-game streak in 1941.
August 30 – With knuckleball pitcher Charlie Hough on the mound, Texas Rangers catcher Geno Petralli ties a Major League record by committing six passed balls in a 7–0 loss to the Detroit Tigers at Tiger Stadium. All seven runs are unearned and come as a result of the passed balls. Petralli will go on to commit 35 passed balls on the season, breaking J. C. Martin's single-season record of 33 in 1965.
September 9 – Nolan Ryan strikes out 16 to pass 4,500 for his career as the Houston Astros beat the San Francisco Giants 4–2. Ryan strikes out 12 of the final 13 batters and fans Mike Aldrete to complete the seventh inning for his 4,500th strikeout.
September 14 – In the midst of the Toronto Blue Jays' 18–3 drubbing of the Baltimore Orioles, Cal Ripken Jr. is lifted from the lineup and replaced by Ron Washington, stopping Ripken's consecutive innings played streak at 8,243.
September 18 – Darrell Evans hits his 30th home run of the season, and becomes the first player to do so after the age of 40.
September 21 – Darryl Strawberry swipes his 30th base of the season to join the 30–30 club.  With teammate Howard Johnson already having joined, it marks the first time that two teammates achieve 30–30 seasons in the same year.
September 22 – Wade Boggs of the Boston Red Sox reaches the 200-hit mark for the fifth straight season in an 8–5 loss to the Detroit Tigers.
October 4 – The Detroit Tigers defeat the Toronto Blue Jays 1–0 to clinch the American League East division title. The victory caps off a thrilling pennant race in which the Tigers overcame a 3.5 game deficit to the Blue Jays in the last two weeks of the season, including sweeping the Blue Jays at Tiger Stadium in the final weekend, and finishing two games ahead of Toronto in the standings.
October 25 – In Game Seven of the World Series, starter Frank Viola and reliever Jeff Reardon hold the St. Louis Cardinals to six hits, as the Minnesota Twins win 4–2 for their second World Championship, and their first since moving to Minnesota and changing their name to the Twins. The franchise's first title came in 1924 as the Washington Senators. Viola is named the Series MVP.
November 18 – Andre Dawson of the Chicago Cubs is announced as the winner of the National League MVP Award, becoming the first recipient of the award to play for a last place team.

References

External links
1987 Major League Baseball season schedule at Baseball Reference

 
Major League Baseball seasons